Thomas Greminger (born 22 April 1961) is a Swiss diplomat. He was born in Lucerne.

Greminger served as secretary-general for the Organization for Security and Co-operation in Europe (OSCE), from July 2017 to July 2020.
Since May 2021 he is Director of the Geneva Centre for Security Policy

Other activities
 International Gender Champions (IGC), Member

References

External links

1961 births
People from Lucerne
Swiss diplomats
Living people
Organization for Security and Co-operation in Europe
OSCE Secretaries General